The 1899 Iowa State Cyclones football team represented Iowa State College of Agricultural and Mechanic Arts (later renamed Iowa State University) as an independent during the 1899 college football season. Under head coaches Pop Warner and Joe Meyers, the Cyclones compiled a 5–4–1 record, and outscored all opponents by a combined total of 118 to 38. The team won the first four games by a combined score of 107 to 0, then failed to score a point in the final five games. C. J. Griffith was the team captain.

Between 1892 and 1913, the football team played on a field that later became the site of the university's Parks Library.

Schedule

References

Iowa State
Iowa State Cyclones football seasons
Iowa State Cyclones football